Calle Real is Spanish for Royal Street, sometimes associated with El Camino Real (California).

Calle Real may refer to:  
Calle Real, Iloilo, name used to refer to a street and business district in Iloilo City, Philippines
Calle Real (album), a 1983 album by Andalusian flamenco singer Camarón de la Isla
Calle Real (band), a band from Sweden playing popish Timba